Ilkufi (also Romanized as Īlkūfī; also known as Elkūfeh and Īlkūfī-ye Chūbar) is a village in Chubar Rural District, Haviq District, Talesh County, Gilan Province, Iran. At the 2006 census, its population was 194, in 50 families.

References 

Populated places in Talesh County